A. A. Aziz is an Indian politician, belonging to the Revolutionary Socialist Party (RSP). He was a MLA from Eravipuram for the 11th, 12th and 13th Niyamasabha, representing Eravipuram. In March 2012 he was unanimously elected secretary of the Kerala State Committee of RSP.

References

Living people
Revolutionary Socialist Party (India) politicians
Kerala MLAs 2001–2006
Kerala MLAs 2006–2011
Kerala MLAs 2011–2016
1941 births